Agyneta parva is a species of sheet weaver found in the United States. It was described by Banks in 1896.

References

parva
Spiders of the United States
Endemic fauna of the United States
Spiders described in 1896